Daniel Aaron Bress (born 1979) is an American lawyer and jurist who serves as a United States circuit judge of the United States Court of Appeals for the Ninth Circuit.

Early life and education 
Bress was raised in Gilroy, California. He studied government at Harvard University, graduating in 2001 with a Bachelor of Arts magna cum laude. He worked as a paralegal at the Federal Trade Commission from 2001 to 2002, then attended the University of Virginia School of Law, where he was editor-in-chief of the Virginia Law Review. He graduated in 2005 with a Juris Doctor magna cum laude and Order of the Coif membership.

Legal career
After graduating from law school, Bress served as a law clerk to judge J. Harvie Wilkinson III of the United States Court of Appeals for the Fourth Circuit from 2005 to 2006 and then for justice Antonin Scalia of the Supreme Court of the United States from 2006 to 2007. He then entered private practice in the San Francisco office of the law firm Munger, Tolles & Olson. From 2011 to 2019, Bress was a partner at the Washington, D.C. office of Kirkland & Ellis. He has served as an adjunct professor of law at the University of Virginia and Columbus School of Law of the Catholic University of America.

Federal judicial service 

On January 30, 2019, President Donald Trump announced his intent to nominate Bress to serve as a United States Circuit Judge of the United States Court of Appeals for the Ninth Circuit. On February 6, 2019, his nomination was sent to the Senate. He was nominated to the seat vacated by Alex Kozinski, who retired on December 18, 2017. On May 22, 2019, a hearing on his nomination was held before the Senate Judiciary Committee. On June 20, 2019, his nomination was reported out of committee by a 12–10 vote. On July 8, 2019, the United States Senate invoked cloture on his nomination by a 50–42 vote and on the following day, July 9, his nomination was confirmed by a 53–45 vote. He received his judicial commission on July 26, 2019.

Memberships 

He has been a member of the Federalist Society since 2003.

See also 
 Donald Trump judicial appointment controversies
 List of Jewish American jurists
 List of law clerks of the Supreme Court of the United States (Seat 9)

References

External links 
 
 

1979 births
Living people
21st-century American lawyers
21st-century American judges
Catholic University of America faculty
California lawyers
Federalist Society members
Harvard College alumni
Judges of the United States Court of Appeals for the Ninth Circuit
People associated with Kirkland & Ellis
Law clerks of the Supreme Court of the United States
Lawyers from Washington, D.C.
People associated with Munger, Tolles & Olson
People from Gilroy, California
United States court of appeals judges appointed by Donald Trump
University of Virginia School of Law alumni
University of Virginia School of Law faculty